Nefisa Berberović (born 3 July 1999) is a Bosnian tennis player.

Berberović has career-high rankings of 221 in singles and 479 in doubles.

Playing for the Bosnia and Herzegovina Fed Cup team, she has a win–loss record of 10–2 as of December 2022.

Career
She made her WTA Tour debut at the 2022 Internationaux de Strasbourg as a lucky loser. She then defeated former top-10 player Sloane Stephens in the first round of the main draw.

ITF Circuit finals

Singles: 12 (7 titles, 5 runner–ups)

Doubles: 16 (10 titles, 6 runner–ups)

National representation

Fed Cup/Billie Jean King Cup
Berberović made her debut for the Bosnia and Herzegovina Fed Cup team in 2017, while it was competing in the Europe/Africa Zone Group I, when she was 17 years and 233 days old.

Singles (2–0)

Doubles (1–1)

Mediterranean Games

Doubles: 1 (silver medal)

References

External links
 
 
 

1999 births
Living people
Sportspeople from Tuzla
Bosnia and Herzegovina female tennis players
Competitors at the 2018 Mediterranean Games
Mediterranean Games silver medalists for Bosnia and Herzegovina
Mediterranean Games medalists in tennis